The 2017 Scotties Tournament of Hearts was held from February 16 to 26 at the Meridian Centre in St. Catharines, Ontario. The Rachel Homan rink, representing Ontario, won their third national title; with Homan becoming the youngest skip, man or woman, to ever win three national championships. Her team represented Canada at the 2017 World Women's Curling Championship in Beijing from March 18 to 26.

Teams
The 2017 Scotties was notable for the presence of many veteran skips from previous Canadian Women's Championship tournaments. Shannon Kleibrink made her 5th Scotties appearance after defeating the 2-time Scotties Silver Medalist Valerie Sweeting in the Alberta final; however, issues with back pain limited her performance. Marla Mallett of British Columbia and Stacie Curtis of Newfoundland and Labrador made their 4th Scotties appearances, as well as Mary Mattatall who was in her 5th as Team Nova Scotia after upsetting last year's Nova Scotia Champion Jill Brothers. PEI's Robyn MacPhee made her 8th Scotties appearance, Ève Bélisle of Quebec made her 3rd, and Kerry Galusha of the Northwest Territories made her 14th Scotties appearance. Geneva Chislett returned again for Team Nunavut, as did Sarah Koltun for the Yukon. The only two teams to make their Scotties debuts were Penny Barker of Saskatchewan and Melissa Adams of New Brunswick. Notably absent was the 5-time Scotties Champion and 12-time Manitoba Scotties champion, Jennifer Jones, who was defeated in the Manitoba Scotties Semifinal by Darcy Robertson, who lost to Michelle Englot (9-time Saskatchewan Scotties Champion) in the final. The headline teams for this year's Scotties were last year's Silver Medalist Krista McCarville who defeated Tracy Fleury in Northern Ontario for the second year in a row, the 2-time Scotties Champion Rachel Homan who won the southern Ontario final against Jacqueline Harrison, and the defending Champions Chelsea Carey of Team Canada.

The teams are listed as follows:

CTRS ranking

Pre-qualifying tournament

Standings

Results
All draw times are listed in Eastern Standard Time (UTC−5).

Draw 1
Thursday, February 16, 6:30 pm

Draw 2 
Friday, February 17, 8:00 am

Draw 3 
Friday, February 17, 4:00 pm

Pre-qualifying final
Saturday, February 18, 2:30 pm

Round robin standings
Final Round Robin Standings

Round robin results
All draw times are listed in Eastern Standard Time (UTC−5).

Draw 1
Saturday, February 18, 2:30 pm

Draw 2
Saturday, February 18, 7:30 pm

Draw 3
Sunday, February 19, 9:30 am

Draw 4
Sunday, February 19, 2:30 pm

Draw 5
Sunday, February 19, 7:30 pm

Draw 6
Monday, February 20, 2:30 pm

Draw 7
Monday, February 20, 7:30 pm

Draw 8
Tuesday, February 21, 9:30 am

Draw 9
Tuesday, February 21, 2:30 pm

Draw 10
Tuesday, February 21, 7:30 pm

Draw 11
Wednesday, February 22, 9:30 am

Draw 12
Wednesday, February 22, 2:30 pm

Draw 13
Wednesday, February 22, 7:30 pm

Draw 14
Thursday, February 23, 9:30 am

Draw 15
Thursday, February 23, 2:30 pm

Draw 16
Thursday, February 23, 7:30 pm

Draw 17
Friday, February 24, 9:30 am

Playoffs

1 vs. 2
Friday, February 24, 7:30 pm

3 vs. 4
Saturday, February 25, 2:30 pm

Semifinal
Saturday, February 25, 7:30 pm

Bronze medal game
Sunday, February 26, 2:30 pm

Final
Sunday, February 26, 7:30 pm

Statistics
Round Robin only

Awards
The awards and all-star teams are as follows:

All-Star Teams
First Team
Skip:  Rachel Homan, Ontario
Third:  Emma Miskew, Ontario
Second:  Joanne Courtney, Ontario
Lead:  Blaine de Jager, British Columbia

Second Team
Skip:  Chelsea Carey, Team Canada
Third:  Shannon Aleksic, British Columbia
Second:  Sarah Wilkes, Alberta
Lead:  Lisa Weagle, Ontario

Marj Mitchell Sportsmanship Award
 Kerry Galusha, Northwest Territories

Joan Mead Builder Award
 Wendy Morgan, who is both Program Manager and team leader of the Canadian wheelchair curling program, helping the national team win three Paralympic gold medals.

Notes

References

External links

 
2017 in Canadian curling
Scotties Tournament of Hearts
Sport in St. Catharines
Curling in Ontario
2017 in Ontario
February 2017 sports events in Canada
2017 in women's curling